Mount Pierre is a sharp conical peak, 210 m, standing immediately south of Moureaux Point on Kran Peninsula, Liège Island, in the Palmer Archipelago of Antarctica. It was discovered and named by the Belgian Antarctic Expedition under Adrien de Gerlache, 1897–99.

References

Mountains of the Palmer Archipelago
Liège Island